In mathematics, a Waldhausen category is a category C equipped with some additional data, which makes it possible to construct the K-theory spectrum of C using a so-called S-construction. It's named after Friedhelm Waldhausen, who introduced this notion (under the term category with cofibrations and weak equivalences) to extend the methods of algebraic K-theory to categories not necessarily of algebraic origin, for example the category of topological spaces.

Definition
Let C be a category, co(C) and we(C) two classes of morphisms in C, called cofibrations and weak equivalences respectively. The triple (C, co(C), we(C)) is called a Waldhausen category if it satisfies the following axioms, motivated by the similar properties for the notions of cofibrations and weak homotopy equivalences of topological spaces:

 C has a zero object, denoted by 0;
 isomorphisms are included in both co(C) and we(C);
 co(C) and we(C) are closed under composition;
 for each object A ∈ C the unique map 0 → A is a cofibration, i.e. is an element of co(C);
 co(C) and we(C) are compatible with pushouts in a certain sense.

Relations with other notions
In algebraic K-theory and homotopy theory there are several notions of categories equipped with some specified classes of morphisms.  If C has a structure of an exact category, then by defining we(C) to be isomorphisms, co(C) to be admissible monomorphisms, one obtains a structure of a Waldhausen category on C. Both kinds of structure may be used to define K-theory of C, using the Q-construction for an exact structure and S-construction for a Waldhausen structure. An important fact is that the resulting K-theory spaces are homotopy equivalent.

If C is a model category with a zero object, then the full subcategory of cofibrant objects in C may be given a Waldhausen structure.

S-construction 
The Waldhausen S-construction produces from a Waldhausen category C a sequence of Kan complexes , which forms a spectrum. Then the group

is the n-th K-group of C. Thus, it gives a way to define higher K-groups. Another approach for higher K-theory is Quillen's Q-construction.

The construction is due to Friedhelm Waldhausen.

biWaldhausen categories

A category C is equipped with bifibrations if it has cofibrations and its opposite category COP has so also. In that case, we denote the fibrations of COP by quot(C). 
In that case, C is a biWaldhausen category if C has bifibrations and weak equivalences such that both (C, co(C), we) and (COP, quot(C), weOP) are Waldhausen categories.

Waldhausen and biWaldhausen categories are linked with algebraic K-theory. There, many interesting categories are complicial biWaldhausen categories. For example: 
The category  of bounded chain complexes on an exact category .
The category  of functors  when  is so.
And given a diagram , then  is a nice complicial biWaldhausen category when  is.

References 

 C. Weibel, The K-book, an introduction to algebraic K-theory — http://www.math.rutgers.edu/~weibel/Kbook.html
 G. Garkusha, Systems of Diagram Categories and K-theory — https://arxiv.org/abs/math/0401062

See also 
Complete Segal space

External links 

Category theory
Algebraic K-theory